The 1889–90 season was Stoke's second season in the Football League.

It was another poor season for Stoke, as they again finished bottom of the Football League but this time they failed to gain re-election and their place was taken by Sunderland and Stoke joined the Football Alliance for the following season. Stoke's worst league and FA Cup defeat came during the 1889–90 season, a 10–0 reverse against Preston North End and an 8–0 cup defeat to Wolverhampton Wanderers. Stoke won just three matches all season and picked up just ten points making it the club's worst performance in league football.

Season review

League
After finishing bottom of the league last season Stoke failed to improve a great deal in the 1889–90 season and again took the wooden spoon. They were humiliated 10–0 in the second match of the season away at Preston North End where all the goals were scored by Scottish internationals as Stoke suffered their worst league defeat. Stoke also lost 8–0 away to both Everton and Blackburn Rovers and they also suffered a 6–1 reverse against Aston Villa. Stoke were awful throughout the season and went on a ten match losing streak stretching from 19 October 1889 to 4 January 1890. In a tough home fixture against Burnley just before Christmas, Bob McCormick, the Stoke inside-right, badly injured his collar bone in a challenge with the Burnley full-back and at the end of the match some supporters invaded the pitch and confronted the "Clarets" defender. Stoke won the match 2–1 but Burnley lodged an appeal claiming their players had been intimidated. The League decided in Burnley's favour and ordered the match to be replayed, this time Burnley won 4–3.

Stoke won only three matches this season and amassed a mere ten points three fewer than Burnley and 23 behind champions, for the second season running Preston. Stoke failed to gain re-election and the end of the season and their place was taken by Sunderland. Stoke joined the Football Alliance for the 1890–91 season. A 7–1 victory over Accrington where Bob Ramsay scored the "Potters" first hat-trick was a rare highlight in what was an awful season. At the end of the season manager Harry Lockett left the club to concentrate on his job as secretary of the Football League and Joseph Bradshaw took over.

FA Cup
In the FA Cup, Stoke knocked out Old Westminsters and Everton but were ousted from the competition by Wolverhampton Wanderers. This third round tie was played on 15 February 1890 in driving sleet and rain on a heavy pitch and Wolves more suited to the conditions easily won the match 4–0. Stoke protested over the state of the pitch and the FA ordered a re-match the following Saturday. This time Wolves doubled the score to 8–0 much to the embarrassment of the Stoke officials. The result is Stoke's worst  in the FA Cup.

Final league table

Results

Stoke's score comes first

Legend

Football League

FA Cup

Squad statistics

References

Stoke City F.C. seasons
Stoke